Melvin Perry (Poirier) (23 August 1925 – 25 January 2002) was a Canadian politician. He also went by the name Perry Poirier.

Born in St. Edward, Prince Edward Island, he received a Bachelor of Arts degree in 1952 from the University of St. Joseph's College. He was a teacher for 34 years including 15 years as a Principal. He retired from teaching in 1987.

In 1999, he was appointed by Prime Minister Jean Chrétien to the Canadian Senate, representing the senatorial division of Prince Edward Island. He was the first Acadian appointed from Prince Edward Island since Joseph-Octave Arsenault was appointed in 1895, he served a little less than a year until he retired at the age of 75.

References

External links
 

1925 births
2002 deaths
People from Prince County, Prince Edward Island
Acadian people
Canadian educators
Canadian senators from Prince Edward Island
Liberal Party of Canada senators